Agios Georgios Tymfristou is a village and a former municipality in Phthiotis, Greece. Since the 2011 local government reform it is part of the municipality Makrakomi, of which it is a municipal unit. The municipal unit has an area of 157.064 km2. Population 2,305 (2011).

External links
 Municipality of Agios Georgios Tymfristou

References

Populated places in Phthiotis